Silica or silicon dioxide is a chemical compound.

Silica may also refer to:
 Silica gel, a desiccant
 Silica, Rožňava District, Slovakia
 Silica, Kansas, United States
 Silica, Minnesota, United States
 Silica, West Virginia
 Silica, Wisconsin, United States
 USS Silica (IX-151), a boat
 Silica, a character from the light novel and anime series Sword Art Online

See also
 Siliqua (disambiguation)